"Argument Clinic" is a sketch from Monty Python's Flying Circus, written by John Cleese and Graham Chapman. The sketch was originally broadcast as part of the television series and has subsequently been performed live by the group. It relies heavily on wordplay and dialogue, and has been used as an example of how language works.

Plot
After the episode's end credits have scrolled, a BBC voiceover announces that there will be "Five more minutes of Monty Python's Flying Circus." In the ensuing sketch, an unnamed man portrayed by Michael Palin approaches a receptionist (Rita Davies) and says he would like to have an argument. She directs him to a Mr. Barnard (identified as Mr. Vibrating in episode transcripts), who occupies an office along the corridor. Palin initially enters the wrong office, in which a man played by Graham Chapman hurls angry insults at him. Palin says that he came into Chapman's room for an argument, causing Chapman to apologize and clarify that his office is dedicated to "abuse". Even after politely sending Palin on his way, Chapman calls him a "stupid git".

Palin enters the next office, which contains Mr. Barnard/Vibrating, played by John Cleese. Palin asks if he is in the right office for an argument, to which Cleese responds that he has already told him he is. Palin disputes this, and the men begin an argumentative back-and-forth. Their exchange is a very shallow one, consisting mostly of petty and contradictory "is/isn't" responses, to the point that Palin feels he is not getting what he paid for. They then argue over the very definition of an argument until Cleese rings a bell and announces that Palin's paid time has concluded.

Palin is dissatisfied, and tries to argue with Cleese over whether he really got as much time as he paid for, but Cleese insists he is not allowed to argue unless Palin pays for another session. When Palin finally relents and pays more money for additional arguing time, Cleese continues to insist he has not paid, and another argument breaks out over that issue. Palin believes he has caught Cleese in a contradiction—arguing without being paid—but Cleese counters that he could be arguing in his spare time. Frustrated, Palin storms out of the room.

The original broadcast version features Palin exploring other rooms in the clinic; he enters a room marked "Complaints" hoping to lodge a complaint, only to find that it is a complaint clinic in which Eric Idle is complaining about his shoes. The next office contains Terry Jones offering "being-hit-on-the-head lessons", which Palin finds a stupid concept. Eventually, a series of policemen enter the room to end the sketch, one remarking on the skits’ tendency to end in policemen halting the skit. As he realizes he is a part of the skits’ absurdity, another policeman enters the room, and the sketch ends.

Writing
The sketch parodies modern consumer culture, implying that anything can be purchased, even absurd things such as arguing, abuse, or being hit over the head.
The sketch was typical for Cleese's and Chapman's writing at the time, as it relied on verbal comedy. Python author Darl Larsen believes the sketch was influenced by music hall and radio comedy, particularly that of the Goons, and notes that there is little camera movement during the original television recording.

One line in the middle of the sketch, "An argument is a connected series of statements intended to establish a definite proposition" was taken almost verbatim from the Oxford English Dictionary.

Performances
The sketch originally appeared in the 29th episode of the original television series, entitled "The Money Programme", and was released (in audio only) on the LP Monty Python's Previous Record, on Charisma Records in 1972.

The sketch was subsequently performed live at the Hollywood Bowl in September 1980, which was filmed and released as Monty Python Live at the Hollywood Bowl. The sketch features the discussion with the receptionist (played here by Carol Cleveland), the abuse from Chapman, and most of the argument between Cleese and Palin. It is then ended abruptly by the entrance of Terry Gilliam, on wires, singing "I've Got Two Legs". A further live performance occurred in 1989 at the Secret Policeman's Ball, where Cleveland's and Chapman's roles were replaced by Dawn French and Chris Langham. This performance was subsequently released on DVD. The sketch was performed again in July 2014 during Monty Python Live (Mostly), with Terry Jones filling in for Chapman's role and Gilliam reprising "I've Got Two Legs".

Cultural references
The sketch has been frequently used as an example of how not to argue, because, as Palin's character notes, it contains little more than ad hominem attacks and contradiction, and does not contribute to critical thinking. It has also been described as a "classical case in point" of dialogue where two parties are unwilling to co-operate, and as an example of flawed logic, since Palin is attempting to argue that Cleese is not arguing with him.

The text of the argument has been presented as a good example of the workings of English grammar, where sentences can be reduced to simple subject/verb pairs. It has been included as an example of analysing English in school textbooks. The sketch has become popular with philosophy students, who note that arguing is "all we are good at", and wonder about the intellectual exercise one could get from paying for a professional quality debate.

The Python programming language, which contains many Monty Python references as feature names, has an internal-only module called "Argument Clinic" to pre-process Python files.

See also
Equivocation
Ipse dixit
Kettle logic

References

Citations

Sources

External links
Live performance at the Secret Policeman's Ball (from the official channel)
Transcription of the script

Arguments
Monty Python sketches
1972 in British television